Rubner may refer to:

 Ben Rubner (1921 – 1998), British trade unionist
 Max Rubner (1854 – 1932), German physiologist and hygienist
 Michael Rubner, American engineer
 Rubner Peak, the highest point on the sharp ridge separating McCance and Widdowson Glaciers in Antarctica